The Men's 400 metres event at the 2011 European Athletics U23 Championships was held in Ostrava, Czech Republic, at Městský stadion on 14 and 16 July.

Medalists

Results

Final
16 July 2011 / 16:40

Heats
Qualified: First 2 in each heat (Q) and 2 best performers (q) advance to the Final

Summary

Details

Heat 1
14 July 2011 / 19:10

Heat 2
14 July 2011 / 19:17

Heat 3
14 July 2011 / 19:24

Participation
According to an unofficial count, 21 athletes from 14 countries participated in the event.

References

400 metres
400 metres at the European Athletics U23 Championships